Camille Olivia Cosby ( Hanks; born March 20, 1944) is an American television producer, philanthropist, and the wife of comedian Bill Cosby. The character of Clair Huxtable from The Cosby Show was based on her. Cosby has avoided public life, but has been active in her husband's businesses as a manager, as well as involving herself in academia and writing. In 1990, Cosby earned a master's degree from the University of Massachusetts Amherst, followed by a Doctorate of Education (Ed.D.) in 1992.

Early life and education
Camille Olivia Hanks was born on March 20, 1944, in Washington D.C., to Guy A. Hanks Sr. and Catherine C. Hanks and grew up in Norbeck, Maryland, just outside Washington. She is the oldest of four children. Cosby's father was a chemist at Walter Reed General Hospital and her mother worked at a nursery. Both of her parents had college educations, with her father earning a graduate degree from Fisk University and her mother earning an undergraduate degree from Howard University.

Cosby attended private Catholic schools. First, she attended St. Cyprian's, followed by St. Cecilia's Academy. Cosby stated, "The Oblate Sisters were my first formal educators. They did what all educators should do, that is, convey the knowledge of wide-ranging possibilities, and, more importantly, give a stamp of self-value for every single student." After high school, Cosby studied psychology at the University of Maryland, where she met Bill Cosby.

In June 1987, Johnetta Cole of Howard University in Washington, D.C., presented Cosby with a Doctor of Humane Letters, an honorary doctoral degree.

In 1990, Cosby earned a master's degree from the University of Massachusetts Amherst, followed by an Doctorate of Education (Ed.D.) in 1992. In a 2014 interview with Oprah Winfrey, she said,

Career

Cosby avoided public life. She acted as manager for her husband and has been depicted as a "shrewd businesswoman."  During an interview with Ebony, Bill Cosby stated, "People would rather deal with me than with Camille. She's rough to deal with when it comes to my business." She also "help[ed] in the development of her husband's material", including suggestions for The Cosby Show, like suggesting the Huxtable family be middle rather than working class. The character of Clair Huxtable from The Cosby Show was based on her.

Cosby supports African-American literature, and has written forewords for several books: In 1993 for Thelma Williams' Our Family Table: Recipes and Food Memories from African-american Life Models; In 2009 for Dear Success Seeker: Wisdom from Outstanding Women by Michele R. Wright; and in 2014 for The Man from Essence: Creating a Magazine for Black Women, a book by Edward Lewis of Essence.

In 1994, Cosby released Television's Imageable Influences: The Self-Perception of Young African-Americans, a book that "dramatically charts the damaging impact of derogatory images of African Americans produced in our media establishments." The book was originally intended to be the subject of her thesis for her doctoral degree.

Cosby worked with David C. Driskell on his book The Other Side of Color: African American Art in the Collection of Camille O. and William H. Cosby Jr., which focused on the Cosby's art collection in 2001. Together, Cosby and Renee Poussaint edited A Wealth of Wisdom: Legendary African American Elders Speak in 2004.

In 2001, Cosby was a co-founder of the National Visionary Leadership Project, a group whose mission is to "develop the next generation of leaders by recording, preserving, and sharing the stories of extraordinary African American elders".

Cosby was co-producer for the Broadway play Having Our Say: The Delany Sisters' First 100 Years, based on the book of the same name by Sarah "Sadie" L. Delany and A. Elizabeth "Bessie" Delany with Amy Hill Hearth. Following the success of the play, Cosby acquired the film, stage and television rights to the story and later acted as executive producer for the 1999 television movie of the same name.

Philanthropy
Cosby's history of philanthropy includes donations to schools and educational foundations. Her philanthropic memberships include Operation PUSH, The United Negro College Fund, the Southern Christian Leadership Conference, the National Council of Negro Women, and Jesse Jackson's National Rainbow Coalition.

Beginning at the start of the 1980s, Cosby and her husband donated $100,000 to Central State University (CSU), a historically black university in Ohio, with a second gift of $325,000 in 1987. In September 1989, CSU held the "Camille and Bill Cosby Cleveland Football Classic" in honor of their contributions to the school.

In January 1987, the Cosbys donated $1.3 million to Fisk University. In November 1988, they donated $20 million to Atlanta's Spelman College, a women's college with a predominantly Black enrollment. According to The New York Times, the gift was the largest donation to a black college in American history. The college has since named the five-story 92,000 square foot Camille Olivia Hanks Cosby Academic Center after her as well as designating a Camille Cosby Day. A few months after the Spelman donation, Cosby and her husband donated $800,000 to Meharry Medical College and $750,000 to Bethune-Cookman University.

In July 1992, during a gala held at the Metropolitan Museum of Art, the National Coalition of 100 Black Women awarded Cosby the Candace Award, a recognition of minority women who have made valuable contributions to their communities. In April 2005, Cosby donated $2 million to St. Frances Academy, a Black Catholic high school in Baltimore. Because of the donation, the school could endow sixteen scholarships in Cosby's name.

Bill Cosby sexual assault cases

Cosby has defended her husband against accusations he has sexually assaulted women over his career. In 2014, Cosby released a statement saying that her husband had been the victim of unvetted accusations: "The man I met, and fell in love with, and whom I continue to love, is the man you all knew through his work. He is a kind man ... and a wonderful husband, father and friend."

On December 9, 2015, attorney Joseph Cammarata subpoenaed Cosby to give a deposition in a defamation lawsuit filed against her husband by seven women. A U.S. Magistrate Judge later dismissed her motion to quash the subpoena, and she was ordered to testify under oath. In the deposition of February 2016, Cosby invoked spousal privilege when asked whether Bill had been faithful to her. Cosby's support of her husband has been questioned; in The Progressive Revolution, author Ellis Washington wrote "...I am transfixed by the slavish complicity and psychotic denial of Camille" positing she may be "the greatest sexual sociopath sympathizer in history".

After her husband's conviction for sexual assault on May 3, 2018, Cosby released a three-page statement defending her husband in which she compared his conviction to the racially charged killing of Emmett Till, a fourteen-year-old boy who was lynched after a white woman said she was offended by him in her family's grocery store. Cosby also called for a criminal investigation into the Pennsylvania prosecutor behind the conviction and argued that her husband had a "binding agreement" with Bruce Castor that he would not be charged in the case. The Undefeated stated, "Camille Cosby's words show she's trapped in an outdated space." HuffPost called the statement "bizarre".

Personal life

While studying at the University of Maryland, Cosby went on a blind date during her sophomore year with Bill. Engaged shortly after they began dating, the pair married on January 25, 1964 in the Catholic Church (Camille being notably devout).

Following their marriage, Cosby and her husband had five children: Erika (born 1965), Erinn (born 1966), Ennis (April 15, 1969 – January 16, 1997), Ensa (April 8, 1973 – February 23, 2018), and Evin (born 1976).

Ennis was murdered on January 16, 1997, at age 27. After his murder, Cosby wrote a letter to USA Today titled "America Taught My Son's Killer to Hate Blacks", in which she "excoriat[ed] America for teaching her son's murderer the bigotry that fueled his lethal act." The controversial letter was not well received by pundits or the press. Authors Stephan and Abigail Thernstrom wrote they believed Cosby's article was "misguided despair ... [that] threatens further progress" in the development of race relations in the United States.

Cosby's daughter Ensa died February 23, 2018, of renal disease while awaiting a kidney transplant at age 44.

In 1982, Cosby joined the Reverend Jesse Jackson and his wife, Jacqueline Jackson; congressman William H. Gray III; and historian Mary Frances Berry to meet Pope John Paul II at the Vatican, where the group was pictured with the pope.

Along with Bill, Cosby was featured on the cover of Ebony's September 1966 issue. In 1996, she was named one of the "15 most beautiful Black women" by the magazine.

Art collection
Cosby is an avid art collector, including African American-made quilts. In her personal collection she has multiple works by Ellis Ruley. She has been the subject of multiple portraits by artist Simmie Knox. In December 1981, Cosby purchased Henry Ossawa Tanner's The Thankful Poor at Sotheby's, which she gave to her husband for a Christmas gift. In 2018, Cosby and her husband sold a painting titled Going West by Thomas Hart Benton, which had only been displayed publicly twice since being painted in 1926, for an undisclosed sum.

Filmography

References

External links
 

1944 births
Living people
African-American activists
American art collectors
American art patrons
American philanthropists
American television producers
Bill Cosby
Patrons of schools
University of Maryland, College Park alumni
University of Massachusetts Amherst College of Education alumni
Writers from Philadelphia
Writers from Washington, D.C.
African-American Catholics